The Journal of Media Law is a biannual peer-reviewed academic journal published by Hart Publishing. It was established in 2009 and is indexed by EBSCOhost, Academic Search Complete, and Applied Science & Technology Abstracts. The editors-in-chief are Eric Barendt (University College London), Thomas Gibbons (University of Manchester), and Rachael Craufurd Smith (University of Edinburgh).

References

External links 

 
 Print: 
 Online: 

Law journals
Publications established in 2009
English-language journals
Media studies journals
Biannual journals